A wedding anniversary is an annual commemoration of the date that a wedding took place. Couples often mark the occasion by celebrating their relationship, either privately or with a larger party. Special celebrations and gifts are often given for particular anniversary milestones (e.g., 10, 15, 20, or 25 years). In some cultures, traditional names exist for milestone anniversaries; for instance, fifty years of marriage may be known variously as a "golden wedding anniversary", "golden anniversary" or "golden wedding".

History and Recognition
Associating a wedding anniversary with precious metals such  as "gold" (50 years) or "silver" (25 years) has been documented in Germanic countries since the 1500s. In English-speaking countries, the tradition of associating gift-giving with wedding anniversaries became more prevalent in the nineteenth century, alongside the emergence of the Victorian era.  In the twentieth century, increased commercialization led to the inclusion of more anniversaries to a list of predetermined gifts.

In some parts of the world, couples can receive special recognition from government officials for particular milestones. In the Commonwealth realms, a couple can receive a message from the monarch for 60th, 65th and 70th wedding anniversaries and for any wedding anniversary after that. This is done by applying to Buckingham Palace in the United Kingdom or to the governor-general's office in the other Commonwealth realms.

In Australia, couples can receive a congratulatory letter from the governor-general on the 50th and all subsequent wedding anniversaries. The prime minister, the Leader of the Opposition, local members of both state and federal parliaments as well as state governors may also send salutations for the same anniversaries.

In Canada, couples can also receive a message from the governor-general for the 50th anniversary and every fifth anniversary after that.

In the United States, a couple can receive an anniversary greeting card from the president for the 50th and all subsequent anniversaries.

Roman Catholics may apply for a papal blessing through their local diocese for wedding anniversaries of a special nature (25th, 50th, 60th, etc.).

Celebration and gifts

Some significant anniversaries have names that suggest appropriate or traditional gifts, such as a silver or platinum jubilee. Gifts may be exchanged by spouses or given by guests at parties; they may also influence an anniversary party's theme or decoration. These gifts vary in different countries, but some anniversary years now have well-established connections common to many nations; a popular analogy are the numerous jubilees thrown to celebrate anniversary milestones in the reigns of English monarchs, all of which are also associated with precious stones or metals.

 25th anniversary: silver
 40th anniversary: ruby
 50th anniversary: gold 
 60th anniversary: diamond 
 70th anniversary: platinum

In English-speaking countries, the fifth-year gift (wood) was cut on the day of celebration and then presented to the wife as a finished item before the next two quarter days had passed.

In 1937, the American National Retail Jeweler Association (now known as Jewelers of America as a result of an organizational merger) introduced an expanded list of gifts. The revamped list gave a gift for each year up to the 25th and then for every fifth anniversary after that.

In South India, 60th and 80th wedding anniversaries are accompanied by large celebrations similar to weddings. In Tamil Nadu, there is a famous Thirukadaiyur Temple where special pujas are conducted for wedding anniversaries.

Traditional anniversary gifts

Flower gifts 
Flowers are also associated with wedding anniversaries up to and including the 50th anniversary.

See also
 Hierarchy of precious substances

References

External links 
 
 

Anniversaries
Wedding